Thomas Elliot Lewis (born 10 December 1998) is an English actor. Thomas (Tom) was born and grew up in Leeds before moving to London and graduated from RADA (Royal Academy of Dramatic Art) in 2017. He is known for his role in the television series Gentleman Jack, as well as his role in the film Redeeming Love.

Filmography

Film

Television

Video game

Theatre

References

External links
 
 Tom Lewis at Spotlight

1998 births
Living people
English male film actors
English male television actors
Male actors from London
Alumni of RADA